Daniel Munduruku (Belém do Pará, February 28, 1964) is a Brazilian writer and educator. He is member of the Munduruku indigenous people. His children's books deal about traditional indigenous life and tales and have been awarded several prizes. Munduruku holds three undergraduate degrees in philosophy, History and Psychology. He has a master's degree in Social Anthropology and a doctorate in education by the University of São Paulo.

Besides being a writer, he worked as a teacher and is involved in many organizations that strive for the culture and literature of the indigenous people of Brazil. Munduruku is president of the Instituto Indígena Brasileiro da Propriedade Intellectual (Brazilian Indigenous Institute of Intellectual Property), director of the Instituto Uk'a – A Casa dos Saberes Ancestrais (Uk'a Institute – The House of Ancient Knowledge) and president of the Academy of Letters of Lorena. He is managing director of the Museu do Índio of Rio de Janeiro.

Works

A primeira estrela que vejo é an estrela do meu desejo e outras histórias indígenas de  amor
Você lembra, pai?, Global Editora, 2005, 
Sabedoria das águas, Global Editora, 2004 
Contos indígenas brasileiros, Global Editora, 2005 
Parece que foi ontem
Outras tantas histórias indígenas de origem das coisas e do universo, Global Editora, 2008 
A caveira-rolante, a mulher-lesma e outras histórias indígenas de assustar, Global Editora, 
O banquete dos deuses, 2000, Editora Angra, 
A velha árvore, Editora Salesiana, 2002, 
As peripécias do jabuti, Mercuryo Jovem, 2007, 
As serpentes que roubaram a noite, 2001, Peiropolis, 
Caçadores de aventuras, CARAMELO, 
Catando piolhos contando histórias, Brinque-Book, 2006 
Coisas de índio, 2000, Callis Editora,
Crônicas de São Paulo, Callis Editora Limited, 2011, 
O diário de Kaxi, Editora Salesiana, 2001, 
Um estranho sonho de futuro, FTD, 2004, 
Os filhos do sangue do céu, Landy Editora, 2005
Histórias de índio, Companhia das Letrinhas, 1997
Histórias que eu ouvi e gosto de contar, 2004, Callis Editora Ltd, 
Histórias que eu vivi e gosto de contar, Callis Editora Ltd.
Kabá Darebü
Meu vô Apolinário, 2001, Studio Nobel, 
O homem que roubava horas
O olho bom do menino, Brinque-Book, 2007 
O onça
O segredo da chuva, Ed. Ática, 2006, 
O sinal do pajé, 2003, Peiropolis, 
O sumiço da noite, 2006, Caramelo, 
Parece que foi ontem
Sobre piolhos e outros afagos
Tempo de histórias, Ed. Moderna, 2005, 
O sonho que não parecia sonho, Caramelo livros educativos, 2007, 
Uma aventura na Amazônia, Caramelo, 

Books published in English

Amazonia-Indigenous Tales from Brazil, 2013, Groundwood Books, 
Tales of the Amazon-How the Munduruku Indians Live, 2000, Groundwood Books,

Awards
Honorable Mention in the UNESCO Prize for Children's and Young People's Literature in the Service of Tolerance (2003)
Prêmio Jabuti de Literatura (Jabuti Literature Prize)(2004).  
Prize of the National Foundation for Children and Young People's Books Fundação Nacional para o Livro Infantil e Juvenil (FNLIJ)  (2005)
Prize of the Academia Brasileira de Letras (Brazilian Academy of Literature)
Érico Vannucci Mendes Prize, of the Conselho Nacional de Desenvolvimento Científico e Tecnológico (National Council for Scientific and Technological Development)

References

External links
 Official Site

Living people
Brazilian male writers
Brazilian educators
Brazilian people of indigenous peoples descent
1964 births
People from Belém